Brice Blanc (born January 16, 1973 in Lyon, Rhone, France) is a jockey in American thoroughbred horse racing.

Blanc attended a jockey's apprentice school in his native France then, encouraged by trainer Ben Cecil, in October 1993 emigrated to the United States where he settled in Southern California and began racing at area tracks. He competed primarily at Del Mar Racetrack, Hollywood Park Racetrack and Santa Anita Park but also won races at various other North American racetracks including Arlington Park in Chicago, Gulfstream Park in Florida, and Woodbine Racetrack in Toronto, Ontario, Canada.

After spending close to ten years racing in California he relocated to Kentucky where he raced until 2006 when he returned to California

References
 Brice Blanc at the NTRA

Year-end charts

1973 births
Living people
French jockeys
American jockeys
Sportspeople from Lyon
French emigrants to the United States